Wing Chun is a Chinese martial art.

Wing Chun may also refer to:

 Wing Chun (film), a 1994 Hong Kong martial arts film 
 Wing Chun (TV series), two Hong Kong martial arts TV series: one in 1994, one from 2004-2007
 Kung Fu Wing Chun, a 2010 martial arts film starring Bai Jing
 Yim Wing-chun, legendary martial artist